Manoir-des-Trembles-Val-Tétreau District (District 6) is a municipal district in the city of Gatineau, Quebec. It is currently served on Gatineau City Council by Jocelyn Blondin.

The district is located in the Hull sector of the city. The district includes the western part of Hull, including the neighbourhoods of Birch Manor (Manoir-des-Trembles), Jardins-Alexandre-Taché, Val-Tétreau, Jardins-Mackenzie-King and part of Wrightville.

The district was created for the 2013 election from parts of Plateau–Manoir-des-Trembles District and Hull–Val-Tétreau District.

Councillors
Jocelyn Blondin (2013–present)

Election results

2021

2017

2013

References

Map of districts

Districts of Gatineau